Thomas Cremer (born 7 July 1945 in Miesbach, Germany ), is a German professor of human genetics and anthropology with a main research focus on molecular cytogenetics and 3D/4D analyses of nuclear structure studied by fluorescence microscopy including super-resolution microscopy and live cell imaging. Thomas Cremer is the brother of the German physicist Christoph Cremer and Georg Cremer, Secretary General of the German Caritas Association.

Biography
Thomas Cremer was raised in Aachen. He studied medicine at the Human Medical School, Albert Ludwigs University of Freiburg, where he graduated in 1970 and received his doctoral degree in 1973. From 1974-1978 he was leader of a research group at the Institute of Anthropology and Human Genetics, University of Freiburg followed by a fellowship as research associate at the University of California, Irvine (1978) in the group of M.W. Berns. From 1978-1996 he headed an independent research group at the Institute of Anthropology and Human Genetics, University of Heidelberg. In 1986 he received a Heisenberg scholarship of the Deutsche Forschungsgemeinschaft combined with a position as visiting professor at the Yale University, New Haven, Connecticut in the group of  Laura Manuelidis and David C. Ward.  From 1996-2010 he held the position of a  Full Professor, Chair of Anthropology and Human Genetics in the Faculty of Biology at the Ludwig Maximilian University of Munich. Thomas Cremer is corresponding member of the Academy of Sciences Heidelberg (2001)  and member of the German Academy of Sciences Leopoldina (2006). Since his retirement 10/2010 he has continued several research projects at the LMU.

Scientific Contributions

Thomas Cremer was an early supporter of the idea that higher order chromatin arrangement and the architecture of the nucleus are essential for cardinal nuclear functions. Spatial organization of chromatin, now considered as the highest level of epigenetic gene regulation, has been the focus of his research since the early 70's. 
Together with his brother Christoph Cremer he pioneered laser-UV-microirradiation experiments that indirectly implied a territorial organization of chromosomes in the interphase nucleus. This finding led Thomas Cremer to his concept of a new field of cytogenetic research, called by him as interphase cytogenetics. 
Realization of interphase cytogenetics was achieved during the 1980s where T. Cremer made major contributions to the development of in situ hybridization techniques to visualize normal and aberrant chromosomes and chromosomal subregions directly in the cell nucleus and provided direct evidence for chromosome territories (CTs). During the 1990s he realized together with P. Lichter the concept of comparative genomic hybridization to metaphase chromosomes and to a matrix with DNA spots representing specific genomic sites. During the late 1990s until now his laboratory has made major achievements in 3D multicolor FISH allowing the simultaneous visualization of all human chromosomes in human cells. In addition, he developed methods to visualize individual CTs and nuclear subcompartments to study their dynamics in living cells. T. Cremer has achieved major insight to compare nuclear phenotypes in a variety of species, ranging from primates, birds  to the micro- and macronucleus of  ciliates with the goal to classify universally valid, species and cell-type specific normal features of nuclear architecture and distinguish them from disease correlated features.

Scientific awards 

 2005: Maffo Vialli International Award for Histochemistry for pioneering contributions to the study of higher order chromatin arrangement through laser-UV microirradiation and fluorescence based molecular cytogenetics.
 2009: Award of the Schleiden Medal of the German Academy of Sciences Leopoldina for his distinguished scientific work on nuclear architecture with special focus on the topography of chromosomes in the nucleus.
 2011: Award of the "Medal of honor" from the German Society of Human Genetics
 2011: Honorary member of the European Cytogenetics Association (E.C.A.)
 2015: Award of the "Wilhelm Bernhard Medal" together with his wife Marion Cremer  for their joint contributions on genome structure and function.

Literature

External links 
 

Living people
1945 births
German geneticists
German molecular biologists
Schleiden Medal recipients